Songs of Bob Dylan is a 2017 studio album by American singer-songwriter Joan Osborne, recorded in tribute to American folk rock musician Bob Dylan. The album was met with positive reviews by critics.

Recording and release
Songs of Bob Dylan continued a theme of covering and reinterpreting Dylan's music by Osborne, including changing musical style and the gender of the character in the narratives of the songs. She first recorded this set after being approached by Café Carlysle to do a residency and Osborne supported the album with a tour and cabaret show of Dylan's music that included songs from throughout his multi-decade career.

Reception
The editorial staff of AllMusic Guide scored Songs of Bob Dylan four out of five stars, with reviewer Mark Deming writing that "she demonstrates she has a real knack for bringing his words to life", highlighting the emotional depth of her vocal performance. Hal Horowitz of American Songwriter gave this album four out of five stars, commenting on the diversity of Osborne's selections and her reinterpretations of Dylan's music, summing up that "she sheds new light on old material, exposes some seldom heard Dylan gems and proves once again how flexible and powerful his work remains". Hayden Benfield notes for Renowned for Sound that "a few of the tracks may arguably adhere too closely to the originals, bordering on imitation except for the vocals... it is clear how Osborne has earned her reputation as a deft cover artist when not performing originals" and praises the album's high quality.

Track listing
All songs written by Bob Dylan, except where noted
"Tangled Up in Blue" – 5:43
"Rainy Day Women #12 & 35" – 4:05
"Buckets of Rain" – 3:55
"Highway 61 Revisited" – 4:19
"Quinn the Eskimo (The Mighty Quinn)" – 4:20
"Tryin' to Get to Heaven" – 4:26
"Spanish Harlem Incident" – 2:56
"Dark Eyes" – 4:02
"High Water (For Charley Patton)" – 3:53
"You're Gonna Make Me Lonesome When You Go" – 4:12
"Masters of War" (traditional and Jean Ritchie) – 4:23
"You Ain't Goin' Nowhere" – 3:15
"Ring Them Bells" – 3:13

Personnel
"Tangled Up in Blue"'
Joan Osborne – lead vocals, backing vocals, production
Jim Boggia – electric guitar
Keith Cotton – Wurlitzer electric piano, recording (backing vocals), additional engineering, production
Michael Hartmann – acoustic guitar
Glenn Ianaro – additional engineering, engineering assistance
Pete Keppler – engineering
Jay Mortaen – bass guitar
John Bon Nielsen – recording
Kent Olsen – drums, recording
Jack Petruzzelli – engineering, production, executive production
Matt Shane – additional engineering, mixing at Atomic Sound, New York City, New York, United States
"Rainy Day Women #12 & 35"'
Joan Osborne – lead vocals, production
Andrew Carillo – slide guitar
Aaron Comess – drums
Keith Cotton – piano, backing vocals, Hammond M-1 organ, additional engineering, production
Richard Hammond – bass guitar
Glenn Ianaro – additional engineering, engineering assistance
Pete Keppler – engineering, mixing at The Treehouse, Lake Katonah, New York, United States
Jack Petruzzelli – backing band, baritone guitar, percussion, engineering, production, executive production
Matt Shane – additional engineering
"Buckets of Rain"'
Joan Osborne – lead vocals, production
Keith Cotton – piano, additional engineering, production
Glenn Ianaro – additional engineering, engineering assistance, mixing at Interactive Sound
Pete Keppler – engineering
Jack Petruzzelli – acoustic guitar, engineering, production, executive production
Matt Shane – additional engineering
"Highway 61 Revisted"'
Joan Osborne – lead vocals, production
Andrew Carillo – electric guitar
Aaron Comess – drums
Keith Cotton – Wurlitzer electric piano, additional engineering, production
Richard Hammond – bass guitar
Glenn Ianaro – additional engineering, engineering assistance
Pete Keppler – engineering, mixing at The Treehouse, Lake Katonah, New York, United States
Jack Petruzzelli – acoustic guitar, slide guitar, engineering, production, executive production
Matt Shane – additional engineering
"Quinn the Eskimo (The Mighty Quinn)"'
Joan Osborne – lead vocals, production
Andrew Carillo – electric guitar
Aaron Comess – drums
Keith Cotton – piano, Hammond B-3 organ, hand claps, backing vocals, additional engineering, production
Richard Hammond – bass guitar
Glenn Ianaro – additional engineering, engineering assistance
Pete Keppler – engineering, mixing at The Treehouse, Lake Katonah, New York, United States
Audrey Martells – backing vocals
Jack Petruzzelli – electric guitar, tambourine, hand claps, backing vocals, engineering, production, executive production
Matt Shane – additional engineering
Carl Spataro – hand claps
"Tryin' to Get to Heaven"'
Joan Osborne – lead vocals, production
Keith Cotton – piano, additional engineering, production
Glenn Ianaro – additional engineering, engineering assistance, mixing at Interactive Sound
Pete Keppler – engineering
Jack Petruzzelli – electric guitar, tambourine, sleigh bells, engineering, production, executive production
Matt Shane – additional engineering
"Spanish Harlem Incident"'
Joan Osborne – lead vocals, backing vocals, production
Andrew Carillo – electric guitar
Aaron Comess – drums
Keith Cotton – Wurlitzer electric piano, Hammond B-3 organ, backing vocals, additional engineering, production
Richard Hammond – bass guitar
Glenn Ianaro – additional engineering, engineering assistance
Pete Keppler – engineering
David Mann – tenor saxophone
Jack Petruzzelli – acoustic guitar, engineering, production, executive production
Matt Shane – additional engineering, mixing at Atomic Sound, New York City, New York, United States
"Dark Eyes"'
Joan Osborne – lead vocals, production
Keith Cotton – organ, additional engineering, production
Glenn Ianaro – additional engineering, engineering assistance, mixing at Interactive Sound
Pete Keppler – engineering
Jack Petruzzelli – acoustic guitar, harmonium, Omnichord, engineering, production, executive production
Matt Shane – additional engineering
"High Water (For Charley Patton)"'
Joan Osborne – lead vocals, production
Andrew Carillo – sitar
Aaron Comess – drums
Keith Cotton – piano, Wurlitzer electric piano, Hammond B-3 organ, Prophet 6 synthesizer, additional engineering, production
Richard Hammond – bass guitar
Glenn Ianaro – additional engineering, engineering assistance
Pete Keppler – engineering
Rich Pagano – mixing at New Calcutta Recording Studio, New York City, New York, United States
Jack Petruzzelli – acoustic guitar, slide guitar, electric guitar, engineering, production, executive production
Matt Shane – additional engineering
"You're Gonna Make Me Lonesome When You Go"'
Joan Osborne – lead vocals, production
Keith Cotton – piano, additional engineering, production
Yair Evnine – cello
Glenn Ianaro – additional engineering, engineering assistance
Pete Keppler – engineering
Rich Pagano – mixing at New Calcutta Recording Studio, New York City, New York, United States
Jack Petruzzelli – acoustic guitar, engineering, production, executive production
Matt Shane – additional engineering
"Masters of War"'
Joan Osborne – lead vocals, production
Keith Cotton – piano, additional engineering, production
Cameron Greider – additional engineering
Glenn Ianaro – additional engineering, engineering assistance
Pete Keppler – engineering
Jack Petruzzelli – acoustic guitar, engineering, production, executive production
Matt Shane – additional engineering, mixing at Atomic Sound, New York City, New York, United States
"You Ain't Goin' Nowhere"'
Joan Osborne – lead vocals, backing vocals, production
Andrew Carillo – acoustic guitar
Aaron Comess – drums
Keith Cotton – piano, backing vocals, additional engineering, production
Richard Hammond – bass guitar
Glenn Ianaro – additional engineering, engineering assistance
Pete Keppler – engineering
Audrey Martells – backing vocals
Jack Petruzzelli – acoustic guitar, mandolin, backing vocals, engineering, production, executive production
Matt Shane – additional engineering, mixing at Atomic Sound, New York City, New York, United States
Antoine Silverman – fiddle
"Ring Them Bells"'
Joan Osborne – lead vocals, production
Keith Cotton – piano, additional engineering, production
Pete Keppler – engineering
Glenn Ianaro – additional engineering, engineering assistance
Jack Petruzzelli – Moog mini-synthesizer, engineering, production, executive production
Matt Shane – additional engineering, mixing at Atomic Sound, New York City, New York, United States
Antoine Silverman – violin
Technical personnel
Dan Emery – etching on vinyl LP double album
Fred Kervorkian – mastering at Welcome to 1979

See also
List of 2017 albums

References

External links

Track-by-track commentary by Osborne

2017 albums
Joan Osborne albums
Bob Dylan tribute albums
Thirty Tigers albums
Albums produced by Keith Cotton
Albums produced by Jack Petruzzelli